Wolfgang Goedecke (23 July 1906 – 15 August 1942) was a German rower. He competed in the men's coxless four event at the 1928 Summer Olympics. He was killed in action during World War II.

References

1906 births
1942 deaths
German male rowers
Olympic rowers of Germany
Rowers at the 1928 Summer Olympics
Rowers from Dresden
German military personnel killed in World War II